Sarah Hayes may refer to:
 Sarah Hayes (crossword compiler), British crossword setter also known as Arachne
 Sarah Hayes (musician), British folk artist
 Sarah Hayes (writer), author of books illustrated by Barbara Firth including The Grumpalump (1991)

See also
 Sara Hayes (born 1982), Irish camogie player
 Sarah Hay (born 1987), American actress and ballet dancer